Rubin Collins Jr. (born October 19, 1953) is an American former professional basketball player. Born in Philadelphia, Pennsylvania, he attended Edison High School. He played college basketball for the Maryland Eastern Shore Hawks from 1971 to 1974. During his junior season in 1973–74, Collins led the Hawks in scoring when they won the MEAC men's basketball tournament and became the first men's basketball team from a historically black college to receive an invitation to the National Invitation Tournament (NIT). He was named to the first-teams of the All-MEAC and All-NAIA in 1974.

At the conclusion of his junior season, Collins successfully applied for a hardship from the National Basketball Association (NBA) to be eligible in the 1974 NBA draft. He was selected by the Portland Trail Blazers as the 38th overall pick but never played in the NBA.

Collins played one game for the Scranton Apollos of the Eastern Basketball Association (EBA) during the 1974–75 season. He played for the Lancaster Red Roses of the EBA during the 1976–77 season. He played two seasons in the Continental Basketball Association (CBA) for the Washington Metros, Baltimore Metros and the Mohawk Valley Thunderbirds from 1977 to 1979.

He has been inducted into the Maryland Eastern Shore Athletics Hall of Fame twice: as a member of the 1973–74 NIT team in 2004 and individually in 2010.

References

External links
College statistics

1953 births
Living people
African-American basketball players
American men's basketball players
Basketball players from Philadelphia
Lancaster Red Roses (CBA) players
Maryland Eastern Shore Hawks men's basketball players
Portland Trail Blazers draft picks
Shooting guards
21st-century African-American people
20th-century African-American sportspeople